Til Death may refer to:

Til death, a portion of the English-language Christian marriage vows
Til Death (album), a 1998 album by The Undead
Til Death (album), a 2012 album by Capture the Crown
Til Death, an album by Aesthetic Perfection
Til Death (song), a 2011 song by Wynter Gordon
'Til Death, an American sitcom
Till Death..., a British sitcom
" 'Til Death" (Person of Interest), an episode of the American television drama series Person of Interest
Till Death (Lebanese TV series), a Lebanese television drama 
Till Death (2021 film), a 2021 American action thriller film

See also
Til Death Do Us Part (disambiguation)

Till Death (disambiguation)